Dúbravka is a city borough of Bratislava, the capital of Slovakia. It is located in the north-western part of the city, lying on the slopes of the Devín Carpathians mountains. It is part of the Bratislava IV administrative district. 
The city borough covers 862 ha and is home to approximately 39,000 inhabitants. The borough is served by both public transport trams and buses, yet Dúbravka is known for the low level of service provided here.

Dúbravka features a museum, Villa rustica remains from the Roman times, a covered ice stadium, ŠKP Dúbravka football stadium, numerous schools, two Roman Catholic churches and an Evangelical church. The Dúbravka House of Culture is the cultural center of the borough.

Location 
Dúbravka borders Karlova Ves to the south, Devín to the west, Devínska Nová Ves to the north and Lamač to the north-east.

Division 
Dúbravka is divided into three local parts: Krčace, Záluhy and Podvornice.
 Krčace is the southernmost part of Dúbravka at the border with the Karlova Ves borough. It is a non-residential area consisting mostly of recreational cottages and it features the Iuventa youth complex, swimming pool Rosnička, and the ŠKP football stadium.
 Záluhy start at the crossroads of Mikuláša Schneidera Trnavského Street, Karloveská street and Harmincova Street continuing to the west. The area consists of typical socialist era panel houses.
 Podvornice is an area roughly bordered by Saratovská Street, the D2 motorway, Nejedlého Street from the north and Drobného Street from the south.

History 

Dúbravka was a separate village already in existence in the 14th century; at that time it was an administrative part of Devín. Since the 1730s until 1945 it was owned by the Malacky branch of the aristocratic family Pálffy ab Erdöd. It was first mentioned in written documents in 1576 stating that ethnic Croats first settled the nearby village of Lamač in the first half of the 16th century and in the second half they moved into Devín and Dúbravka. It was later mentioned in a 1683 text, while Vienna was last besieged by the Ottoman Empire. The Ottoman expansion and the fact that part of the anti-Ottoman army was stationed in Dúbravka lowered the quality of life in the village.

In the 18th century economic activity in Dúbravka centered around wine-making. The area of worked land rose continuously over the years and farmers in Dúbravka were compensated for the relatively poor soil quality in the village. In the 19th century the village was sacked during the Napoleonic Wars by the French advancing towards Vienna. In 1831 the village suffered a Plague epidemic, with a second outbreak at the end of the Austro-Prussian War in 1866 when it was again sacked and burned. A fire brigade was established in 1889. Important figure in 19th century Dúbravka was the local priest Moyš. Despite Dúbravka not having any ethnic divisions or problems, he strengthened Slovak nationalism in the village. Under his leadership, theater was established in the village in 1905.

In the years 1911-1912 a master carpenter from Braitslava František Tavarík started the construction of recreational wooden houses at the edge of Dúbravka. Later, he started the construction of villas in an area that came to be known as Tavaríkova kolónia. First World War massively disrupted economic activity in the village. Defensive fortifications were constructed in the hills surrounding the village, although they were never used in combat. After the war, the land owned by the noble Mikuláš Pálffy was confiscated and divided. The village was electrified in 1931, local school was constructed in 1935 and drinking water pipes were laid in 1936. Sewage plumbing was laid in 1938. The village struggled with unemployment during the 1930s.

On 6 October 1938 control of the village was violently taken by the local branch of Slovak People's Party. In 1939 the neighboring Devín was annexed by Nazi Germany and Dúbravka became a frontier village. Economic downturn during the Second World War was partially solved by ferrying workers into Germany. The village was occupied by the Red Army on 5 April 1945. Dúbravka was incorporated into Bratislava in April 1946 as the capital city was beginning to expand.

In the 1970s, large-scale construction of socialist apartment blocks started in Dúbravka, essentially dividing the suburb into a small original part with family houses (Old Dúbravka) and the suburb proper consisting of panel houses (sometimes called New Dúbravka) with approximately 15 000 flats.

Population 
The older generations of Croat-descended inhabitants have maintained their own dialect until the present day. Otherwise, their habits and way of life resemble those of the Záhorie people (a region north-west of Bratislava). The people of Dúbravka used to earn their living by working in agriculture, especially producing wine. Their goods were sold to the markets of Bratislava and Vienna.

Croats settled Dúbravka since the 1570s during the fourth wave of Croat settlement. In 1712 there lived 19 farmers and 6 workers without a house in the village. In 1720 and 1736 there were 43 farmers and 7 workers without a house. In 1768 population increased to 86 farmers and 7 workers without a house. First known mayor of Dúbravka was Joachim Milossovits (Zámoravkin) who signed a document from 1768.

After elections in 1906, Slovak language was used both in school and in the local government. In the 1930s people from Dúbravka worked mainly in stone and lime mines in Devínska Nová Ves or in the munitions factory at Patrónka.

Politics 
List of Mayors of Dúbravka and political parties that nominated them:
 1990 – 1994 – Ján Rössel (independent)
 1994 – 1998 – Otto Riesz (KDH, DS, OKS, DÚ, SDĽ)
 1998 – 2002 – Peter Polák (independent)
 2002 – 2006 – Peter Polák (SDKÚ-DS)
 2006 – 2010 – Ján Sandtner (independent)
 2010 – 2014 – Ján Sandtner (independent)
 2014 - 2018 - Martin Zaťovič (Sieť, SDKÚ-DS, KDH, Most–Híd, NOVA, OKS, SaS, SZ, EDS)
 2018 - 2022 - Martin Zaťovič (SaS, OĽaNO, KDH, SME RODINA, OKS, NOVA, Zmena Zdola)

Religion

Catholic churches 

The Roman Catholic Church of St Cosmas and Damian was built in 1720 as a subsidiary church of the Devín parish. It features an elliptic ground-plan and interior decorations from the year 1722.

The Roman Catholic Church of the Holy Spirit is located in M. Sch. Trnavského Street. The building's maintenance has been sponsored by the Roman Catholic Church, mostly from fundraising and financial donations from churchgoers. One million Slovak Crowns was given by the municipal government. The foundations of the building were sanctified by Pope John Paul II  during his visit to Slovakia in Šaštín. The church has an unorthodox design with an unconventional roof shape; it is 30 metres high and has the shape of a circle. It includes both the temple and the pastor's sector. It was designed by Ing. Arch. Ľudovít Režuch and Ing. Arch. Marián Lupták, who also designed the interior. The capacity of the church is about 600 people. The sound distribution quality is high due to the building design, as well as the arrangement of loud-speakers.

The Chapel of Virgin Mary is located in Old Dúbravka together with the cave of Our Lady of Lourdes. The chapel probably started as an unfinished baroque church. It features a late-baroque main altar with a picture of Virgin Mary held by angels and a side altar. It also includes statues of Saint Joseph and Virgin Mary. Even before the construction of the artificial cave, it was a minor pilgrimage site, one out of four most important for local Croats.

Evangelical church 

The church is located in Mikuláša Schneidera Trnavského Street. Originally built as local ceremonial hall, the building is a place of regular worship service from 1995. It has a squared shape and marble lining, outside is a park and small parking slot. The capacity of the church is approximately 200 people in the main hall and this could be expanded up to 300 people by using the minor hall.

Inside the church there is octangular white marble font made as a commemoration to the first Christians creed and traditions. In the main hall there is ca. 4m high wooden cross and a religious artwork Credo.

The church is a center for the evangelical believers from the fourth Bratislava district.

Media 
The Dúbravka local government funds its own magazine, local TV station and webpage.
 Dúbravský spravodajca - Established in 1992, it was called Dúbravské noviny until April 2007, when it was renamed and redesigned. It is distributed free to the majority of households in Dúbravka. Circulation is approximately 16,000 issues.
 Dúbravská televízia - Established in 1999, the local TV station broadcasts 24-hours a day since 2004.
 www.dubravka.sk - In 2008, the homepage was redesigned by the company Alejtech, until this date the web page did not conform to the Act No. 275/2006 Standards for information systems of public administration.

Education 
Dúbravka features 12 high-schools, 9 elementary schools and 13 kindergartens. There is no university in the city borough. Dúbravka also features 2 language schools; Súkromná jazyková škola COGITATIO and Vzdelávacie centrum FREEDU.
 High-school equivalent: Gymnázium (Bilíkova Street No. 24), Pedagogická a sociálna akadémia (Bullova Street No. 2), Stredná priemyselná škola elektrotechnická (Karola Adlera Street No. 5), SŠ - Praktická škola (J. Valašťana-Dolinského Street No. 1), Súkromné gymnázium ALKANA (Batkova Street No. 2), Súkromné konzervatórium ALKANA (Batkova Street No. 2), Súkromná pedagogická škola (Bullova Street No. 2), Súkromná stredná odborná škola veterinárna (Bullova Street No. 2), Súkromné gymnázium (Batkova Street No. 2), Súkromné gymnázium COGITATIO (Batkova Street No. 2), Združená stredná škola potravinárska (Harmincova Street No. 1), Súkromná obchodná akadémia COGITATIO (Batkova Street No. 2)
 Elementary schools: ZŠ Beňovského 1, ZŠ Nejedlého 8, ZŠ Pri kríži 11, ZŠ Sokolíkova 2, Špeciálna základná škola J. Valašťana-Dolinského 1, Súkromná základná škola HARMÓNIA (1.-4.roč.) Batkova 2, Súkromná základná škola s materskou školou The British International School Bratislava J. Valašťana-Dolinského 1, Základná umelecká škola Eugena Suchoňa Batkova 2, Súkromná základná umelecká škola ALKANA Batkova 2
 Kindergartens: MŠ Cabanova 44 (4 classes, 96 kids), MŠ Damborského 3 (4 classes, 97 kids), MŠ Galbavého 5 (4 classes, 98 kids), MŠ Ožvoldíkova 15 (4 classes, 96 kids), MŠ Pekníkova 4 (2 classes, 46 kids), MŠ Pri kríži 2 (4 classes, 96 kids), MŠ Sekurisova 10 (4 classes, 94 kids), MŠ Švantnerova 1 (4 classes, 93 kids), MŠ Ušiakova 1 (4 classes, 95 kids), Cirkevná materská škola Gianny Berettovej Bilíkova 1 (4 classes), Súkromná materská škola WONDERLAND Bazovského 4, Špeciálna materská škola J. Valašťana Dolinského 1, Súkromná materská škola Svetielko Pekníkova 4

The British International School Bratislava, a British international school, is located in two campuses in Dúbravka.

Sports 
Dúbravka features numerous sport venues. Football is represented by the local football club ŠKP Inter Dúbravka with prep and junior teams playing in the second league as well as by the local Police Football team. Women's football team FK Dúbravka offers two classes – junior and senior, playing in the first league. All teams are based in local football stadium FK Dúbravka. Local ice hockey club Hoba Bratislava is based in Dúbravka ice hockey stadium and it concentrates mainly on working with youth.

Dúbravka features also a shooting and archery range opened for shooting clubs and individuals used mainly for sport and entertainment shooting, but also as a training centre for police forces. Archery is represented by the successful Archery club Bratislava which is coached by Alistair Whittingham.

Notable people 
 Gustáv Husák (*1913 – †1991), president of Czechoslovakia, was born here on 10 October 1913, he is buried at the Dúbravka cemetery
 Peter Dvorský, opera singer, performances in Vienna State Opera and New York Metropolitan Opera
 Michal Kováč, former Slovak president resided here
 Leonard Tikl (*1902 – †1973), SDB, Roman Catholic priest end religious prisoner (sentenced to 15 years in prison).
 Emil Benčík, writer, journalist
 František Kele, mountaineer
 Pavel Schenk, sportsperson
 Juraj Wagner, Rector of the University of Trnava

References 

 Dejiny Bratislavy, Vydavateľstvo Obzor, 528s., 1982, 65-019-82

External links 
  
Website of ŠKP Inter Dúbravka local football team 
Website of FK Dúbravka women's football team 
Website of Hoba Bratislava ice hockey team 
Website of shooting range in Dúbravka
Website of Archery club Bratislava
Website of Shooting range Bratislava (gunmates)

Gallery 

Boroughs of Bratislava
Villages in Slovakia merged with towns